Irene Kopelman (born 1974, Córdoba, Argentina) is an artist based in Amsterdam whose work explores the relationship between science and art.

Art critic Kevin Greenberg wrote:
"For the artist Irene Kopelman, exposure is everything. Whether it’s the seared expanses of Egypt’s  White Desert or the freezing waters of the Antarctic, “If I’m not there, out in the elements and directly observing things, even if it’s windy or bitterly cold, the pieces won’t develop the way they should,” she says.

Works 
Kopelman's work marries the clinical distance of scientific observation with an almost spiritual reverence for landscape and the objects, large and small, that comprise it. It is built on the long-term engagement with ecological issues and the parallels between both science and art. The subject matter is a close visual engagement, questioning and exploring how drawing can approach these topics. Her work forms knowledge through the image and the process to make the image about the environment. They also embody the methodologies and systems we use to generate the knowledge and make it visible, creating her own systems of representation through artworks. 

Bergsonian notions of the sublime consumed the psyche of pre-modern Europe and colored much of the continent's art and literature for decades. But much like the phenomenology of Edmund Husserl and Martin Heidegger, Kopelman's work employs the otherness of nature to reveal something integral about the recesses of the individual self."

Awards 
Kopelman won first prize in the 2016-2017 Medifé Arte y Medioambiente Foundation Biennial for her project, "Drawing Camp."

Exhibitions

References

1974 births
Living people